Lisa Raymond and Samantha Stosur were the defending champions, but were eliminated in the final.

Yan Zi and Zheng Jie won the title, defeating Lisa Raymond and Samantha Stosur 6–4, 6–2 in the final. It was the 6th doubles title of the year and the 8th doubles title in their careers for both players.

Seeds

Draw

External links
Main Draw

Pilot Pen Tennis
2006 Pilot Pen Tennis